The 2010 Batu Sapi by-election in the Malaysian state of Sabah was held on 4 November 2010. The nomination of candidates was done on 26 October 2010. The Batu Sapi parliamentary seat fell vacant when its Member of Parliament; Datuk Edmund Chong Ket Wah of United Sabah Party or Parti Bersatu Sabah (PBS), was killed after his 750cc motorcycle accident in Sabah on 9 October 2010. Previously PBS won the seat during the 2008 General Election by a 3,708-vote majority over Independent candidate Chung Kwong Wing. A total 25,720 registered voters eligible to vote in this by-election. The electorate is made of 50.61% Bumiputera, 40.22% Chinese and 3% others.

Results

References 

2010 Batu Sapi by-election
2010 elections in Malaysia
Politics of Sabah
Elections in Sabah